Teodor Shanin  (20 October 1930 – 4 February 2020) was a British sociologist who was for many years Professor of Sociology at the University of Manchester. He was credited with pioneering the study of Russian peasantry in the West, and is best known for his first book, The Awkward Class: Political Sociology of Peasantry in a Developing Society, Russia, 1910–25  (Clarendon Press, 1972). After the collapse of the Soviet Union, Shanin moved to Russia where, with funding from The Open Society Institute, Ford Foundation and others, he founded the Moscow School for the Social and Economic Sciences in 1995. Shanin was President of the Moscow School, Professor Emeritus of the University of Manchester,  and an Honorary Fellow of the Russian Academy of Agricultural Sciences.

His main research interests were Marxism, peasant studies, historical sociology, sociology of knowledge, informal economies, epistemology, and higher education.

In 2002 he was made an Officer of the Order of the British Empire for service to education in Russia.

Biography 

Teodor Shanin was born in Wilno on 29 October 1930. He was exiled to Siberia in 1941 and after being freed on amnesty lived in Samarkand, Lodz, and Paris.

In early 1948 he left for Palestine to take part in the 1948 Arab–Israeli War (Palmach: Harel brigade). In 1952 he graduated from the Jerusalem University College of Social Work, followed by a professional career in social work. He graduated from the Hebrew University of Jerusalem in 1962 and completed his PhD in sociology in 1970 at the University of Birmingham (where his dissertation was titled Cyclical Mobility and Political Consciousness of Russian Peasants 1910–1925). He became a lecturer at Sheffield University, and in 1974 he was appointed Professor of Sociology at Manchester University. He was an Honorary Fellow of the Russian Academy of Agricultural Sciences, Rector of the Moscow School for the Social and Economic Sciences, a Fellow at St Antony's College, Oxford, and Visiting Professor at Ann Arbor Columbia University (US).

Shanin was one of the originators of contemporary peasant studies. He made his name with his books The Awkward Class and Peasants and Peasant Societies, the latter of which was reprinted numerous times and in many languages. For a time it was a basic textbook delimiting the topic. Shanin was one of the initial team of editors of The Journal of Peasant Studies. His other works and teaching addressed historical sociology, social economics, epistemology, interdisciplinary studies, political sciences and rural history. He paid particular attention to conceptualization and analysis of the so-called "developing societies". His fieldwork was in Iran, Mexico, Tanzania, and Russia. Shanin's methods stressed particularly interdisciplinary issues, and pointed at meeting of sociology with history, economics, philosophy, and political sciences. He described himself professionally as a historical sociologist.

Much of Shanin's work was given to Russia and bringing to life methodological traditions of Russia's rural studies of the early 20th century. It was also Russia where his research spilled into active involvement in organization within the educational sphere. This began in the early days of perestroika when, together with academician Tatyana Zaslavskaya, he set up schools for up-training of young Soviet sociologists. The high point of those efforts became creation in 1995 of a Russian-English post-graduate university: the Moscow School for the Social and Economic Sciences, whose first Rector he became. He was President of that graduate university. He was also instrumental in setting up of the InterCentre – a multi-disciplinary research unit of MSSES. Central to his vision and analytical work were efforts to overcome the over-simplifications of the theories of "progress". His works reflected impacts of scholars whom Shanin considered his teachers: Mark Bloch, Alexander Chayanov, C. Wright Mills, and Paul A. Baran. In his later research, he put forward the concept of expolary economies – types of informal economy which challenge neoclassical economics and its relationship to state policies.

Shanin died on 4 February 2020 in Moscow.

Selected publications

Books in English 

 Alavi, Hamza  & Shanin, Teodor (2003) Introduction to the Sociology of "Developing Societies", Monthly Review Press
 "Defining Peasants: Essays Concerning Rural Societies: Expolary economies and Learning from Them” Blackwell Publishing, 1990
 “Revolution as a Moment of Truth: 1905-1907→1917-1922” Yale University Press, 1986
 “Russia as a Developing Society: Roots of Otherness, Russia's Turn of Century” Macmillan, 1985
 "Late Marx and the Russian Road: Marx and the Peripheries of Capitalism", Routledge, GB. Monthly Review US, 1983
 “The Rules of the Game: Models in Contemporary Scholarly Thought” (ed.)  Tavistock Publications, 1972
 "The Awkward Class: Political Sociology of Peasantry in a Developing Society, Russia 1910-1925", Oxford: The Clarendon Press, 1972.
 ‘Peasants and Peasant Societies’ (ed.) Penguin Books, 1971

Books in Russian 

 Отцы и дети. Поколенческий анализ современной России, Левада Ю., Шанин Т., НЛО 2003 [Generational Analysis of Contemporary Russia] 
 Крестьянское восстание в Тамбовской губернии в 1919-1921гг. Антоновщина, (ed. together with V.Danilov) Тамбов, 1994 [The Peasant War in Tambov Region in 1919–1921. Antonovschina]
 Неформальная Экономика: Россия и Мир, (ed.)  Логос, 1999 [Informal economies: Russia and the World];
 Рефлексивное крестьяноведение и десятилетие исследований сельской России, (ed. together with A.Nikulin and V.Danilov)    РОССПЭН, 2002 [Reflexive Peasantology];

References

External links
 Teodor Shanin, The Idea of Progress, 1997.
Web-page about Teodor Shanin's life, books and Moscow School of Social and Economic Sciences, cofounded by him
 Selected Articles

British sociologists
Polish sociologists
Development specialists
Academicians of the Russian Academy of Agriculture Sciences
Academicians of the VASKhNIL
1930 births
2020 deaths
Officers of the Order of the British Empire
Writers from Vilnius
Palmach members
Hebrew University of Jerusalem Faculty of Social Sciences alumni
British Jews
British socialists
Deutscher Memorial Prize winners